The Walking Dead is an American post-apocalyptic horror television series based on the comic series of the same name by Robert Kirkman, Tony Moore, and Charlie Adlard. Developed for television by Frank Darabont, the series airs exclusively on AMC in the United States and is broadcast internationally through Fox Networks Groups and Disney+. The story follows a group of survivors, initially led by Rick Grimes (Andrew Lincoln), as they attempt to survive a zombie apocalypse following a deadly pandemic. The series premiered on October 31, 2010, and will conclude in 2022.

The following is a list of awards and accolades received by The Walking Dead over the course of its airing.

Total awards and nominations for the cast

ASCAP Awards
The ASCAP Awards are awarded annually to composers for outstanding achievements and contributions to the world of film and television music. The Walking Dead has won six awards.

American Film Institute Awards
Established in 2000, the American Film Institute Awards (AFI) is presented by American Film Institute and honors the best ten outstanding films and television programs of each year. The Walking Dead has won twice.

Artios Awards
The Casting Society of America annually present the Artios Awards to honor the work of casting directors in feature films, television and theatre. The Walking Dead has been nominated once.

ASTRA Awards
The ASTRA Awards were awarded annually. According to the Australian Subscription Television and Radio Association (ASTRA), the awards "recognise the wealth of talent that drives the Australian subscription television industry and highlight the creativity, commitment and investment in production and broadcasting". The Walking Dead has won once, with three nominations.

BloodGuts UK Horror Awards
The BloodGuts UK Horror Awards are chosen annually by the BloodGuts UK Horror editors, honoring the best in films and television in the horror genre. The Walking Dead has been nominated once.

Bram Stoker Awards
The Bram Stoker Awards are presented annually by the Horror Writers Association (HWA) for superior achievement in dark fantasy and horror writing. The Walking Dead has been nominated five times, with one win.

Cinema Audio Society Awards
The Cinema Audio Society Awards are annual awards recognizing achievement in sound mixing for film and television. The Walking Dead has been nominated twice.

Costume Designers Guild Awards
The Costume Designers Guild is a labor union for costume designers. Annually they host an awards program recognizing excellence in costume design with five competitive awards for commercials, television, and motion pictures. The Walking Dead has been nominated once.

Critics' Choice Super Awards

Critics' Choice Television Awards
The Critics' Choice Television Awards are presented annually by the Broadcast Television Journalists Association to honor the best in television programming. The Walking Dead has been nominated five times, with two wins.

Directors Guild of America Awards
The Directors Guild of America Awards are awarded annually by the Directors Guild of America, to honor the work of directors in film, television and commercials. The Walking Dead has been nominated once.

Dorian Awards
The Dorian Awards are organized by the Gay and Lesbian Entertainment Critics Association (GALECA). The Walking Dead has been nominated once.

Eddie Awards
The Eddie Awards are presented annually by the American Cinema Editors, celebrating the best in film and television editing. The Walking Dead has been nominated twice, with one win.

EWwy Awards/Poppy Awards
The Poppy Awards, formerly known as the EWwys, honors the Emmy-snubbed shows and actors of the year. The Walking Dead has won one award from eight nominations.

Fangoria Chainsaw Awards
The Fangoria Chainsaw Awards are annual film and television awards for the horror and thriller genres, the nominees are chosen by Fangoria Magazine, then voting is open to the general public.

Golden Globe Awards
The Golden Globe Award is an accolade bestowed by the 93 members of the Hollywood Foreign Press Association (HFPA) recognizing excellence in film and television, both domestic and foreign. The Walking Dead has been nominated once.

Golden Reel Awards
The Golden Reel Awards are given out annually by the Motion Picture Sound Editors to recognize the artistic merit of sound editing in the categories Dialogue, ADR, Effects, Foley and Music.

IGN Awards
The IGN Awards are chosen annually by the IGN editors, honoring the best in film, television, games, comics and anime. The Walking Dead has won five awards from fifteen nominations.

IGN People's Choice Awards
The IGN People's Choice Awards are voted on annually by the general public, they honor the best in film, television, games, comics and anime. The Walking Dead has won five awards.

ICG Publicists Awards
The ICG Publicists Awards hosts the annual Maxwell Weinberg Publicist Showmanship Awards which honors its members working in film and television whose achievements in publicity and promotion are deemed outstanding. The Walking Dead has been nominated once.

Kids Choice Awards
The Nickelodeon Kids' Choice Awards is an annual American children's awards ceremony honoring the year's biggest television, movie, and music acts as voted by viewers worldwide of Nickelodeon networks. The Walking dead has received one nomination.

Make-Up Artists and Hair Stylists Guild Awards
The Make-Up Artists & Hair Stylists Guild is the official labor union for make-up artists and hair stylists in film, television, stage, commercials and digital media.  The annual awards recognize artistic achievement from its members. The Walking Dead has won three times from six nominations, Greg Nicotero has won three awards out of his four nominations.

MTV Movie and TV Awards
The MTV Movie & TV Awards are an annual film and television awards show presented on MTV. The nominees are decided by producers and executives at MTV, and winners are decided online by the general public. The Walking Dead has won once from two nominations.

NAACP Image Awards
The NAACP Image Awards are annually presented to people of color in film, television, music and literature. The Walking Dead has been nominated once.

People's Choice Awards
The People's Choice Awards is an American awards show recognizing the people and the work of popular culture. The show has been held annually since 1975 and is voted on by the general public. The Walking Dead has won five awards from seventeen nominations.

Primetime Emmy Awards
The Primetime Emmy Award, often referred to simply as the Emmy, is an American award bestowed by the Academy of Television Arts & Sciences in recognition of excellence in American primetime television programming, and corresponds to the Academy Award (for film), the Tony Award (for theatre), and the Grammy Award (for music). The Walking Dead has won two awards out of sixteen nominations.

Satellite Awards
The Satellite Awards are a set of annual awards given by the International Press Academy. The Walking Dead has won three awards from seven nominations.

Saturn Awards
The Saturn Awards are presented annually by the Academy of Science Fiction, Fantasy and Horror Films to honor science fiction, fantasy, and horror films, television and home video.

Screen Actors Guild Awards
The Screen Actors Guild Awards are organized by the Screen Actors Guild‐American Federation of Television and Radio Artists. First awarded in 1995, the awards aim to recognize excellent achievements in film and television. The Walking Dead has been nominated five times.

Society of Camera Operators Awards
The Society of Camera Operators is an internationally recognized professional honorary society.  They host annual awards recognizing the achievement of camera operators in film and television. The Walking Dead has been nominated once.

Television Critics Association Awards
The members of the Television Critics Association vote annually for outstanding achievements in television. The Walking Dead has been nominated twice.

Teen Choice Awards
The Teen Choice Awards is an annual awards show that airs on the Fox Network. The awards honor the year's biggest achievements in music, movies, sports, television, fashion and other categories, voted by teen viewers. The Walking Dead has won twice from four nominations.

TP de Oro
The TP de Oro was a Spanish awards show, honoring the best in Spanish and international television programming.  The Walking Dead was nominated once.

TV Quick Awards
The TV Quick Awards were annual television awards, presented by TV Quick magazine, the winners were voted for by the general public. The Walking Dead was nominated once.

Visual Effects Society Awards
Visual Effects Society Awards are presented by the Visual Effects Society and honors the work of visual effects artists in film, television, commercials, music videos and video games. The Walking Dead has been nominated once.

World Soundtrack Awards
The World Soundtrack Academy holds annual awards honoring the music professionals involved in film and television. The Walking Dead has one nomination.

Writers Guild of America Awards
The Writers Guild of America Awards are annual awards given for outstanding writing in film, television, radio, and video games, for both fiction and non-fiction media. The Walking Dead has been nominated twice.

Young Artist Awards
The Young Artist Awards honor young people's achievements in film and television. The Walking Dead has won once out of eight nominations.

References 

Walking Dead
List of Awards